Joseph Gomis (born 2 July 1978) is a French former professional basketball player.

Professional career
Gomis started his professional career with ALM Évreux in 1996, playing there for five seasons. He spent the 2001–02 season with SLUC Nancy, winning the Korać Cup in its final edition.

Between 2002 and 2010, Gomis played in Spain for Breogán, Valladolid and Unicaja Málaga. For the 2010–11 season he signed with Spirou Charleroi of Belgium.

From 2011 to 2014 he played with Limoges CSP, winning the French championship in the 2013–14 season.

In June 2014, he signed with JSF Nanterre for the 2014–15 season.

On 27 August 2015 he retired from professional basketball.

National team career
A member of the French junior national teams during the 1990s, Gomis represented France on two major tournaments, at the 2006 FIBA World Championship and EuroBasket 2007.

References

External links
 Joseph Gomis at acb.com 
 Joseph Gomis at euroleague.net
 Joseph Gomis at eurobasket.com
 Joseph Gomis at fiba.com

1978 births
Living people
2006 FIBA World Championship players
ALM Évreux Basket players
Baloncesto Málaga players
CB Breogán players
CB Valladolid players
Centre Fédéral de Basket-ball players
French expatriate basketball people in Spain
French men's basketball players
Liga ACB players
Limoges CSP players
Nanterre 92 players
Point guards
SLUC Nancy Basket players
Spirou Charleroi players
Sportspeople from Évreux